Cyclosa, also called trashline orbweavers, is a genus of  orb-weaver spiders first described by Anton Menge in 1866. Widely distributed worldwide, spiders of the genus Cyclosa build relatively small orb webs with a web decoration. The web decoration in Cyclosa spiders is often linear and includes prey remains and other debris, which probably serve to camouflage the spider. The name "Cyclosa" comes from Greek 'to move in a circle', referring to how it spins its web.

While most orb-web spiders face downwards in their web when waiting for prey, some Cyclosa species (e.g. C. ginnaga and C. argenteoalba) face upwards.

Notable members

Cyclosa argenteoalba
Cyclosa argenteoalba builds two types of web, a traditional sticky spider web, and a resting web that consists of just a few strands. When infected with a larva of the wasp Reclinervellus nielseni, the spider switches on the behavior to build a resting web. The larva then eats the spider and uses the web to complete metamorphosis.

Cyclosa mulmeinensis
C. mulmeinensis, found on Orchid Island off the southeast coast of Taiwan, makes web decorations similar in size and appearance to itself that act as decoys to distract predatory wasps.

Cyclosa tremula
One small species from Guyana described under the nomen dubium C. tremula has a black and white pattern and rests in the center of an orb web with greyish "imitation spiders" it has created from prey remains. If the spider is disturbed, it vibrates its body, so that the black and white patches blur into grey, thus resembling the false spiders.

Cyclosa turbinata
C. turbinata are known for creating orb-shaped webs, which are webs that utilize both sticky and non-sticky threads, mostly during times of complete darkness. Cyclosa turbinata is unique in that across its spiral wheel-shaped web, it also creates the so-called "trashline" web, which is a line of various components such as prey carcasses, detritus, and, at times, egg cases. This trashline appears to hinder predators from visually locating the spider within its web.

Species

 it contains 180 species:

C. alayoni Levi, 1999 – Cuba, Puerto Rico
C. alba Tanikawa, 1992 – Japan
C. albisternis Simon, 1888 – India (mainland, Andaman Is.). Introduced to Hawaii
C. albopunctata Kulczyński, 1901 – Africa, New Guinea, New Caledonia
C. algerica Simon, 1885 – Mediterranean
C. anatipes (Keyserling, 1887) – Australia (Queensland), Palau
C. andinas Levi, 1999 – Colombia, Ecuador
C. angusta Tanikawa, 1992 – Japan
C. apoblepta (Rainbow, 1916) – Australia (Queensland)
C. argentaria (Rainbow, 1916) – Australia (Queensland)
C. argentata Tanikawa & Ono, 1993 – Taiwan
C. argenteoalba Bösenberg & Strand, 1906 – China, Korea, Taiwan, Japan, Russia (Far East)?
C. atrata Bösenberg & Strand, 1906 – China, Korea, Japan, Russia (Far East)?
C. baakea Barrion & Litsinger, 1995 – Philippines
C. bacilliformis Simon, 1908 – Australia (Western Australia)
C. banawensis Barrion & Litsinger, 1995 – Philippines
C. berlandi Levi, 1999 – USA, Hispaniola to Ecuador
C. bianchoria Yin, Wang, Xie & Peng, 1990 – China
C. bifida (Doleschall, 1859) – India to Philippines, New Guinea
C. bifurcata (Walckenaer, 1841) – Costa Rica, Hispaniola to Argentina
C. bihamata Zhang, Zhang & Zhu, 2010 – China
C. bilobata Sen, Saha & Raychaudhuri, 2012 – India
C. bituberculata Biswas & Raychaudhuri, 1998 – Bangladesh
C. bulla Tanikawa & Petcharad, 2018 – Thailand, Singapore, Brunei
C. bulleri (Thorell, 1881) – New Guinea
C. cajamarca Levi, 1999 – Peru
C. caligata (Thorell, 1890) – Indonesia (Sumatra)
C. camargoi Levi, 1999 – Brazil
C. camelodes (Thorell, 1878) – Seychelles, New Guinea
C. caroli (Hentz, 1850) – USA, Caribbean to Bolivia
C. centrifaciens Hingston, 1927 – Myanmar
C. centrodes (Thorell, 1887) – India to Singapore
C. cephalodina Song & Liu, 1996 – China
C. chichawatniensis Mukhtar & Mushtaq, 2005 – Pakistan
C. circumlucens Simon, 1907 – Guinea-Bissau, São Tomé and Príncipe
C. concolor Caporiacco, 1933 – Libya
C. confraga (Thorell, 1892) – India, Bangladesh to Malaysia
C. confusa Bösenberg & Strand, 1906 – China, Korea, Taiwan, Japan
C. conica (Pallas, 1772) – North America, Europe, Turkey, Caucasus, Russia (Europe to Far East), Iran, Central Asia, China
C. conigera F. O. Pickard-Cambridge, 1904 – Mexico to Honduras
C. coylei Levi, 1999 – Mexico, Guatemala
C. cucurbitoria (Yin, Wang, Xie & Peng, 1990) – China, Thailand
C. cucurbitula Simon, 1900 – Hawaii
C. curiraba Levi, 1999 – Bolivia
C. cylindrata Yin, Zhu & Wang, 1995 – China
C. cylindrifaciens Hingston, 1927 – Myanmar
C. damingensis Xie, Yin & Kim, 1995 – China
C. deserticola Levy, 1998 – Egypt, Israel
C. dianasilvae Levi, 1999 – Ecuador, Peru
C. diversa (O. Pickard-Cambridge, 1894) – Mexico, Cuba to Argentina
C. dives Simon, 1877 – China, Philippines
C. donking Levi, 1999 – Bolivia
C. dosbukolea Barrion & Litsinger, 1995 – Philippines
C. durango Levi, 1999 – Mexico
C. elongata Biswas & Raychaudhuri, 1998 – Bangladesh
C. espumoso Levi, 1999 – Brazil
C. fililineata Hingston, 1932 – Panama to Argentina
C. formosa Karsch, 1879 – West Africa
C. formosana Tanikawa & Ono, 1993 – Taiwan
C. fuliginata (L. Koch, 1872) – Australia (New South Wales, Victoria)
C. ginnaga Yaginuma, 1959 – China, Korea, Taiwan, Japan
C. gossypiata Keswani, 2013 – India
C. groppalii Pesarini, 1998 – Spain (incl. Balearic Is.), Greece (Crete)
C. gulinensis Xie, Yin & Kim, 1995 – China
C. haiti Levi, 1999 – Hispaniola, Jamaica, Puerto Rico (Mona Is.)
C. hamulata Tanikawa, 1992 – Russia (Far East), Japan
C. hexatuberculata Tikader, 1982 – India, Pakistan
C. hova Strand, 1907 – Madagascar
C. huila Levi, 1999 – Colombia
C. imias Levi, 1999 – Cuba
C. inca Levi, 1999 – Colombia to Argentina
C. informis Yin, Zhu & Wang, 1995 – China
C. insulana (Costa, 1834) – Mediterranean to Japan, India to Papua New Guinea, Australia
C. ipilea Barrion & Litsinger, 1995 – Philippines
C. jalapa Levi, 1999 – Mexico
C. japonica Bösenberg & Strand, 1906 – Russia (Far East), China, Korea, Taiwan, Japan
C. jose Levi, 1999 – Costa Rica
C. kashmirica Caporiacco, 1934 – Karakorum
C. kibonotensis Tullgren, 1910 – Central, East Africa, Seychelles
C. koi Tanikawa & Ono, 1993 – Taiwan
C. krusa Barrion & Litsinger, 1995 – Pakistan, India, Philippines
C. kumadai Tanikawa, 1992 – Russia (Far East), Korea, Japan
C. laticauda Bösenberg & Strand, 1906 – China, Korea, Taiwan, Japan
C. lawrencei Caporiacco, 1949 – Kenya
C. libertad Levi, 1999 – Ecuador, Peru
C. lichensis (Rainbow, 1916) – Australia (Queensland)
C. litoralis (L. Koch, 1867) – Samoa, Fiji, Tahiti
C. longicauda (Taczanowski, 1878) – Colombia to Argentina
C. machadinho Levi, 1999 – Brazil, Argentina
C. maderiana Kulczyński, 1899 – Madeira, Canary Is.
C. maritima Tanikawa, 1992 – Japan
C. mavaca Levi, 1999 – Colombia, Venezuela
C. meruensis Tullgren, 1910 – East Africa
C. micula (Thorell, 1892) – India, Singapore
C. minora Yin, Zhu & Wang, 1995 – China
C. mocoa Levi, 1999 – Colombia
C. mohini Dyal, 1935 – Pakistan
C. monteverde Levi, 1999 – Costa Rica, Panama
C. monticola Bösenberg & Strand, 1906 – China, Korea, Taiwan, Japan, Russia (Far East)?
C. moonduensis Tikader, 1963 – India
C. morretes Levi, 1999 – Brazil
C. mulmeinensis (Thorell, 1887) – Asia (without Russia)
C. neilensis Tikader, 1977 – India (Andaman Is.)
C. nevada Levi, 1999 – Colombia
C. nigra Yin, Wang, Xie & Peng, 1990 – China, Vietnam
C. nodosa (O. Pickard-Cambridge, 1889) – Guatemala to Costa Rica
C. norihisai Tanikawa, 1992 – China, Japan
C. oatesi (Thorell, 1892) – India (Andaman Is.)
C. octotuberculata Karsch, 1879 – China, Korea, Taiwan, Japan
C. oculata (Walckenaer, 1802) – Europe, Caucasus, Russia (Europe to Far East), Central Asia, China
C. odateana Kishida, 1915 – Japan
C. ojeda Levi, 1999 – Curaçao
C. okumae Tanikawa, 1992 – Russia (Far East), Korea, Japan
C. olivenca Levi, 1999 – Brazil
C. olorina Simon, 1900 – Hawaii
C. omonaga Tanikawa, 1992 – China, Korea, Taiwan, Japan
C. onoi Tanikawa, 1992 – China, Japan
C. oseret Levi, 1999 – Brazil
C. otsomarka Barrion & Litsinger, 1995 – Philippines
C. pantanal Levi, 1999 – Brazil
C. parangdives Barrion, Barrion-Dupo & Heong, 2013 – China
C. parangmulmeinensis Barrion & Litsinger, 1995 – Philippines
C. parangtarugoa Barrion & Litsinger, 1995 – Philippines
C. paupercula Simon, 1893 – Borneo
C. pedropalo Levi, 1999 – Colombia
C. pellaxoides Roewer, 1955 – Singapore
C. pentatuberculata Yin, Zhu & Wang, 1995 – China
C. perkinsi Simon, 1900 – Hawaii
C. picchu Levi, 1999 – Peru
C. pichilinque Levi, 1999 – Mexico
C. poweri (Rainbow, 1916) – Australia (New South Wales)
C. pseudoculata Schenkel, 1936 – China
C. psylla (Thorell, 1887) – Myanmar, Japan
C. punctata Keyserling, 1879 – Brazil
C. punjabiensis Ghafoor & Beg, 2002 – Pakistan
C. purnai Keswani, 2013 – India
C. pusilla Simon, 1880 – New Caledonia
C. quinqueguttata (Thorell, 1881) – India, Bhutan, Myanmar, China, Taiwan
C. reniformis Zhu, Lian & Chen, 2006 – China
C. rhombocephala (Thorell, 1881) – Australia (Queensland)
C. rostrata Zhou & Zhang, 2017 – China
C. rubronigra Caporiacco, 1947 – Costa Rica to Brazil
C. sachikoae Tanikawa, 1992 – Japan, China
C. saismarka Barrion & Litsinger, 1995 – Pakistan, Philippines
C. sanctibenedicti (Vinson, 1863) – Réunion
C. santafe Levi, 1999 – Colombia
C. sedeculata Karsch, 1879 – China, Korea, Japan
C. senticauda Zhu & Wang, 1994 – China
C. serena Levi, 1999 – Chile, Argentina
C. seriata (Thorell, 1881) – Indonesia (Java)
C. shinoharai Tanikawa & Ono, 1993 – Taiwan
C. sierrae Simon, 1870 – Southern Europe, Hungary, Ukraine, Turkey, Caucasus, Iran
C. simoni Tikader, 1982 – India
C. simplicicauda Simon, 1900 – Hawaii
Cyclosa s. rufescens Simon, 1900 – Hawaii
C. spirifera Simon, 1889 – India, Pakistan
C. tamanaco Levi, 1999 – Trinidad
C. tapetifaciens Hingston, 1932 – Panama to Argentina
C. tardipes (Thorell, 1895) – Myanmar
Cyclosa t. ignava (Thorell, 1895) – Myanmar
C. tauraai Berland, 1933 – French Polynesia (Marquesas Is., Society Is.)
C. teresa Levi, 1999 – Brazil
C. tricolor (Leardi, 1902) – Philippines
C. trilobata (Urquhart, 1885) – Australia, Tasmania, New Zealand
C. tripartita Tullgren, 1910 – East Africa
C. triquetra Simon, 1895 – Mexico, Caribbean to Peru
C. tropica Biswas & Raychaudhuri, 1998 – Bangladesh
C. tuberascens Simon, 1906 – India
C. turbinata (Walckenaer, 1841) – USA to Panama, West Indies, Galapagos Is. Introduced to Hawaii
C. turvo Levi, 1999 – Brazil
C. vallata (Keyserling, 1886) – China, Korea, Taiwan, Japan, Papua New Guinea, Australia (Queensland)
C. vankhedensis Dhande, Bodkhe & Ahmad, 2017 – India
C. vicente Levi, 1999 – Colombia, Brazil, Argentina
C. vieirae Levi, 1999 – Peru, Brazil
C. walckenaeri (O. Pickard-Cambridge, 1889) – USA to Guyana, Caribbean
C. woyangchuan Zhang, Zhang & Zhu, 2010 – China
C. xanthomelas Simon, 1900 – Hawaii
C. yaginumai Biswas & Raychaudhuri, 1998 – Bangladesh
C. zhangmuensis Hu & Li, 1987 – China
C. zhui Zhou & Zhang, 2017 – China

References

Further reading

Araneidae
Araneomorphae genera
Cosmopolitan spiders